Lake Musconetcong is a reservoir located on the border of Morris County and Sussex County, New Jersey, and is part of Hopatcong State Park, which is administered by the New Jersey Department of Environmental Protection. The Musconetcong River flows through the lake.

Lake Musconetcong was created by the building of the Lake Musconetcong Dam in the mid-19th century to provide an additional water source, then known as the Stanhope Reservoir, for the Morris Canal. The lake was deeded over to the State of New Jersey with the other parts of the Morris Canal System in 1924. Boating, fishing, and ice fishing are popular recreational activities on this lake.

Lake Musconetcong is downstream of Lake Hopatcong, the largest lake in New Jersey and is part of its watershed.

The Lake Musconetcong Regional Planning Board has five representatives from each of the five local municipalities, Morris and Sussex counties, and from the State of New Jersey.

Gallery

See also
 Musconetcong Mountain
 Musconetcong River
 Musconetcong Tunnel
 Musconetcong County, New Jersey

References

External links
 
Lake Musconetcong Community Association
 

Lakes of Morris County, New Jersey
Reservoirs in New Jersey
Lakes of Sussex County, New Jersey
Musconetcong River